John T. “Jack” Skelly (June 1, 1927 – November 8, 2016) was a journalist who wrote for a number of news organizations focusing primarily on Latin America and served for a brief period in 1959 as Fidel Castro’s international press coordinator.

Jack Skelly was born to American parents of Irish descent in the Dominican Republic.  The family moved to Cuba a year later where his father, George Martin Skelly, was head of the railroad department for the United Fruit Sugar Co.  He spent his formative years in the town of Banes where Castro’s first wife, Mirta Diaz-Balart, was a neighbor, close childhood friend, and later a mutual teenage crush.

Skelly was in Cuba on assignment for United Press when the Batista regime collapsed and Fidel Castro came to power in January, 1959.  He was at the home of the then ex-Mrs. Castro watching on television as Fidel rode triumphantly into Havana on a Sherman tank. He recalled Mirta telling him, “If he’s as good a leader as he was a father and husband, poor Cuba.”

Castro, who was unprepared to handle the glare of the international media spotlight, noticed Skelly, whom he had met ten years earlier through Diaz-Balart, in the incomprehensible scrum of English-speaking reporters and requested his help.  Skelly assisted with translations and subsequently resigned his position at United Press to handle international press relations for Castro.  He was at the comandante's side for the January 11, 1959, appearance on Face the Nation from Havana, quietly translating some of the questions and answers, which Castro provides in struggling English.  Skelly, initially hopeful that the new government would usher in an era of democratic reforms, quickly grew disillusioned with course the revolution had taken and left the island permanently, becoming a harsh critic of the Castro regime.

Jack Skelly attended high school at Mt. St. Joseph’s High School in Baltimore, Maryland, followed by a two-year stint the Army where he was stationed in Austria and Germany.  He then attended George Washington University where he obtained a degree in journalism.  He married Lucy Alexander Freeman in 1953, with whom he was to father seven children.

Skelly’s thorough grounding in the languages and cultures of the United States and Latin America, much less common during the years that spanned his career than it has become in more recent years, along with his skills as a writer and interviewer, made him uniquely qualified to report and comment on the political upheaval that roiled Latin America during those decades.  He referred to himself as an “American Cuban,” or one of the more generic “bamboo Americans”, children born of American parents who grew up in Latin America.  In addition to his distinguished career as a reporter he served as advisor and speech writer for U.S. presidents of both political parties who sought his insights and assistance in delicate matters concerning intelligence operations and international relations.

At various times during his career, Skelly was a correspondent for the now defunct Washington Star, a publicist for the Pan American Coffee Bureau, and a special assistant to two Organization of American States secretaries general.  He was also Washington Bureau Chief for Puerto Rico’s largest newspaper, El Nuevo Dia.

References

1927 births
2016 deaths
American male journalists
Columbian College of Arts and Sciences alumni